Vansda, also known as Bansda, is a city and a municipality in the Navsari district in the Indian State of Gujarat, covering an area of 557 km2.

Vansda is connected with Waghai, Chikhli, Saputara, Nasik, Vapi, Dharampur, Shamlaji by State highway. The nearest railway station is Unai, though only narrow-gauge trains pass through the station. The nearest railway station for broad-gauge trains is Bilimora Jn.

Vansda is a beautiful town of full social activities. The activities of Junior Chamber International is also running in Vansda Town with the name of JCI Vansda Royal founded by Mr. Amitsinh Desai.

Jaikishan, of the most successful Hindi film music director duo Shankar Jaikishan was born and brought up here.

Bansda was once the capital of Princely State of Bansda until 1949. There is a Tower in Vansda which shows the royal heritage of Vansda. There is a Mosque near the Tower, and Nadir-shah Pir Dargah in Champawadi, which is visited by many Hindu and Muslim devotees.

See also
 Bansda State
 Janki van
 Vansda National Park

References

External links

  Princely state - Bansda
 Charles Thomas 'Thomas kaka' of Vansda
 Govt. college, Vansda
 Vansda Taluka Panchayat- Official webpage (Gujarati language)

Cities and towns in Navsari district